The Berry House was a historic building in Dardanelle, Arkansas. It was originally built in 1872 as the First Presbyterian Church. About 1912, it was converted to a private residence, and the congregation moved into its current location.

The building was a single-story brick structure, with a gabled roof and brick foundation. A cross-gabled porch projected from the front, supported by square posts. It originally had a bell tower and vernacular style. During the conversion to a house, the tower was removed, and the Craftsman-style porch was added.

The building was listed on the National Register of Historic Places in 1998. After several building experts examined the structural integrity of the house, it was determined that the structure was no longer safe. Accordingly, the structure was demolished on January 23, 2020.

See also
National Register of Historic Places listings in Yell County, Arkansas

References

Presbyterian churches in Arkansas
Churches on the National Register of Historic Places in Arkansas
Houses on the National Register of Historic Places in Arkansas
Churches completed in 1872
Houses completed in 1912
National Register of Historic Places in Yell County, Arkansas
Demolished buildings and structures in Arkansas
Dardanelle, Arkansas